The U.S. Pro Indoor (mainly known as such during its run, but also as the U.S. Professional Indoor, the Ebel U.S. Pro Indoor, the Comcast U.S. Indoor, and the Advanta Championships) is a defunct professional tennis tournament held in Philadelphia, United States from 1962 to 1998. It played on indoor carpet courts, and indoor hard courts. It was part of the World Championship Tennis (WCT) circuit from 1968 to 1977 and the Grand Prix Tour from 1978 to 1989 before being held on the ATP Tour. It was held annually first at the Spectrum, and then at the CoreStates Center. It was originally named the Philadelphia Indoor Open Tournament  prior to the open era.

History
The tournament was founded in 1962 as the Philadelphia Invitational Indoor Tennis Championship. The United States Professional Indoor tennis championships were created in Philadelphia, United States, in 1968, as part of the newly created WCT circuit, rival of the National Tennis League (NTL). As the first event of the season, the Philadelphia U.S. Professional Indoor attracted all WCT stars at the Philadelphia Spectrum at each of its yearly editions, with Rod Laver, John Newcombe or Marty Riessen winning the event in the early 1970s. After the WCT absorbed the NTL in 1970, the tournament continued to exist within the WCT tour until 1978, when the event officially became part of the Grand Prix Tour, precursor of the current ATP Tour.

As part of the Grand Prix's top tier tournaments until 1986, the Philadelphia event known as the U.S. Pro Indoor since 1973, saw American players dominating the fields in the 1970s and 1980s, with Tim Mayotte reaching four finals, World No. 1s Jimmy Connors and John McEnroe six finals each, and Czechoslovak Ivan Lendl three. In 1985, Swiss watch company Ebel S.A. started its six-year sponsorship of the event, the tournament becoming until 1990 the Ebel U.S. Pro Indoor. The event entered the new ATP circuit in 1990 as part of the Championship Series, to see eighteen-year-old, and future US Open champion Pete Sampras win his first career title against Andrés Gómez.

In 1991, the event lost Ebel's sponsorship, and went back to being the U.S. Pro Indoor for two editions, before Comcast became the sponsor of the event in 1992, effectively saving it from being discontinued. In the following years, the Comcast U.S. Indoor'''s prize money was reduced to less than a million dollars, preventing the creation of attractive line ups, and gaining the nickname "Comatose U.S. Indoor". In 1997, Advanta, already the sponsor of the 1971-created women's tournament of Philadelphia, the Advanta Championships, since 1995, took upon the sponsorship of the men's event, which also became the Advanta Championships''. Pete Sampras won his third and fourth Philadelphia titles in the last two editions of the event, taking place on indoor hard courts at the CoreStates Center, before it was definitely discontinued in 1998.

Past finals

Singles

Doubles

Records

Singles

See also
 U.S. National Indoor Championships

References

External links
itftennis.com search function (search Philadelphia)

 
ATP Tour
Hard court tennis tournaments
Indoor tennis tournaments
Sports in Philadelphia
Defunct tennis tournaments in the United States
World Championship Tennis
Tennis in Pennsylvania
1968 establishments in Pennsylvania
1998 disestablishments in Pennsylvania
Grand Prix tennis circuit